Mylabris flavoguttata is a species of beetle belonging to the Meloidae family. It was discovered during an exploration of Abyssinia by Pierre Victor Adolphe Ferret and Joseph Germain Galinier (1814–1888).

Distribution
This species occurs in Ethiopia and Angola.

References
 «Synopsis of the described Coleoptera of the World»
Ferret P.V. A. and Galinier. J.G  Voyage en Abyssinie dans les provinces du Tigre, du Samen et de l'Amhara (1839-1843) Tome I-III (1847-1848)[1850] Entomologie.

Meloidae
Beetles described in 1850
Insects of Angola
Insects of Ethiopia